The 1986 Dunedin mayoral election was part of the New Zealand local elections held that same year. In 1986, elections were held for the Mayor of Dunedin plus other local government positions,including twelve city councillors. The polling was conducted using the standard first-past-the-post electoral method.

Background
Mayor Cliff Skeggs was re-elected for a record fourth term. Skeggs split from the Citizens' ticket but was re-elected as an independent candidate. Councillor Bill Christie stood as the official Citizens' candidate, polling third, with Labour's Steve Alexander placing second.

Electoral reforms were implemented at the 1986 municipal elections, the method of electing councillors at large which had been used for decades was replaced with a ward system of local electoral districts.

Results
The following table shows the results for the election:

Results by ward
Cliff Skeggs polled the highest in all four of Dunedin's electoral wards.

Ward results
Candidates were also elected from wards to the Dunedin City Council.

References

Mayoral elections in Dunedin
Dunedin
Politics of Dunedin
1980s in Dunedin
October 1986 events in New Zealand